John Fitzwilliam, 2nd Earl Fitzwilliam MP (circa 1685 – 28 August 1728) of Milton, near Peterborough was an English peer and politician who sat in the House of Commons from 1710 to 1728. The peerage was in the Peerage of Ireland.

Fitzwilliam was the only surviving son of William Fitzwilliam, 1st Earl Fitzwilliam and his wife Anne Cremer, daughter of Edmund Cremer of West Winch, Norfolk.

He was elected Member of Parliament for Peterborough at the  1710 general election and retained the seat in 1713. He was returned unopposed at the 1715 general election. On 17 September 1718, he married Anne Stringer and in 1719 he succeeded his father as 2nd Earl Fitzwilliam, but as it was an Irish peerage it did not affect his entitlement to sit in the House of Commons. He was re-elected as MP for Peterborough at the general elections of 1722 and 1727.

He inherited Milton Hall near Peterborough from his father (in 1719) and developed the stables, park and gardens.

Fitzwilliam died of a fever on 28 August 1728. He and his wife had four children. He was succeeded in his titles and estates by his eldest son, William Fitzwilliam.

References

Year of birth unknown
1728 deaths
Members of the Parliament of Great Britain for English constituencies
British MPs 1710–1713
British MPs 1713–1715
British MPs 1715–1722
British MPs 1722–1727
British MPs 1727–1734
Earls Fitzwilliam